Conus aurantius, common name the golden cone, is a species of sea snail, a marine gastropod mollusk in the family Conidae, the cone snails and their allies.

Like all species within the genus Conus, these snails are predatory and venomous. They are capable of "stinging" humans, therefore live ones should be handled carefully or not at all.

Distribution
This marine snail occurs off the Netherlands Antilles and off the Virgin Islands.

Description 
The maximum recorded shell length is 70.4 mm. The shell has an elevated, tuberculated spire. The surface is irregularly clouded with chestnut or orange and white, and minutely marked with interrupted narrow brown or orange revolving lines, more or less broken up into articulations. Upon the lower half of the body whorl these lines become striae, and are distantly, minutely granular.

Habitat 
Minimum recorded depth is 1.5 m. Maximum recorded depth is 10 m.

References

 Tucker J.K. & Tenorio M.J. (2009) Systematic classification of Recent and fossil conoidean gastropods. Hackenheim: Conchbooks. 296 pp.
 Puillandre N., Duda T.F., Meyer C., Olivera B.M. & Bouchet P. (2015). One, four or 100 genera? A new classification of the cone snails. Journal of Molluscan Studies. 81: 1–23

External links
 The Conus Biodiversity website
 Cone Shells – Knights of the Sea
 

aurantius
Gastropods described in 1792